The Deslondes are an Americana musical group from New Orleans, Louisiana. Their music blends together influences from folk, rock 'n' roll, bluegrass, R&B, American roots music, blues, gospel, country, and zydeco. The group's members are Dan Cutler (vocals/stand-up bass), Sam Doores (vocals/guitar), Riley Downing (vocals/guitar), Cameron Snyder (vocals/percussion), and John James Tourville (fiddle/pedal steel). All five members share in the songwriting process.

The band's first self-titled album was released in 2015 on New West Records.

History 
The band formed in the Holy Cross neighborhood in New Orleans’ Lower Ninth Ward, and take their name from a street in that neighborhood. Sam Doores met Cameron Snyder while attending college. When Doores read Woody Guthrie’s autobiography, Bound for Glory, he quit school to head to New Orleans with Snyder where they formed the band The Broken Wing Routine, and attended the Woody Guthrie Folk Festival in Oklahoma, where they met Missouri native Riley Downing. In New Orleans, Doores met Dan Cutler and formed The Tumbleweeds, while Snyder and John James Tourville met on tour with The Longtime Goners. Doores and Cutler also played in New Orleans band Hurray for the Riff Raff, and The Tumbleweeds often opened for that band.

In 2013, The Tumbleweeds officially changed their name to The Deslondes and two years later released their first album, The Deslondes, to critical acclaim. Their first single, "Fought The Blues And Won," was premiered by NPR. The music video for the song "The Real Deal" premiered on Rolling Stone.

A portion of their song 'Low Down Soul' was played during a scene in Season 6, Episode 3 of the Longmire (TV Series).

Musical Style 
Doores describes the band's songwriting process as a group process: "We're about as democratic as it gets. Five equal members who all write and contribute a whole lot to the project." Their influences are vast, encompassing nearly every American music style. Pitchfork writes,"When the Deslondes open their self-titled debut with a walking piano line played way, way down the left side of the keyboard, they’re not just playing a rhythm that sounds distinctive in 2015 but also conveying an entire pop history that spans New Orleans rhythm and blues, early Memphis rock, Louisiana Hayride country, and every pick-up jazz band ever to busk on Royal Street."

Discography 

 Holy Cross Blues (2012, released as Sam Doores + Riley Downing & The Tumbleweeds)
 I Got Found
 Passin' Through
 Depression Blues
 No Mama Blues
 Low Down & Lonesome
 Blues in Heaven
 This Morning' I Was Born Again
 Reuben's Train
 Wrong Time to Be Right
 Throw Another Cap in the Fire
 Cricket's Creed
 Silver & Gold

 "Fought The Blues and Won" b/w "Yum Yum" (2015, 7" single)

 The Deslondes (2015, New West Records)
 Fought The Blues And Won
 Those Were (Could’ve Been) The Days
 Heavenly Home
 Less Honkin’ More Tonkin’
 Low Down Soul
 The Real Deal
 Still Someone
 Time To Believe In
 Louise
 Simple And True
 Same Blood As Mine
 Out On The Rise

 "Tres Grand Serpent" b/w "What Are They Doing In Heaven Today?" (2016, New West Records)
 Tre Grand Serpent
 What Are They Doing In Heaven Today (ft. Twain)

 Hurry Home (2017, New West Records)
 Muddy Water
 One Of These Lonesome Mornings
 (This Aint A) Sad Song
 She Better Be Lonely
 Every Well
 Ribbon Creeks Collide
 Hurry Home
 Nelly
 Hurricane Shakedown
 Just In Love With You
 Many Poor Boy
 Beautiful Friend
 Deja Vu And A Blue Moon

References

External links 
 deslondes.com

Musical groups from New Orleans